Leonardo Gaciba da Silva (born June 26, 1971, in Pelotas, Rio Grande do Sul), is a former Brazilian football (soccer) referee.

Born in Pelotas, Rio Grande do Sul, Gaciba refereed his first match in 1993 between Guarany Futebol Clube and Grêmio Atlético Farroupilha. In 2005, Gaciba entered into FIFA's squad. He has refereed many CONMEBOL's tournaments and represented Brazil in the Copa Libertadores 2008. He announced his retirement in October 2010.

External links
 Interview to Leonardo Gaciba - 

1971 births
Brazilian football referees
Living people
People from Pelotas